La ragazza del lago, internationally released as The Girl by the Lake, is a 2007 Italian thriller-drama film directed by Andrea Molaioli, in his directorial debut. It is based on a novel written by Karin Fossum.

The film won ten David di Donatello awards for best film, best director, best new director, best screenplay (Sandro Petraglia), best producer (Nicola Giuliano and Francesco Cima), best actor (Toni Servillo), best cinematography (Ramiro Civita), best editing (Giorgio Franchini), best live sound engineer (Alessandro Zanon), and best special effects. It also won three Silver Ribbons .

Cast 
 Toni Servillo - Giovanni Sanzio
 Valeria Golino - Chiara Canali
 Fabrizio Gifuni - Corrado Canali
 Anna Bonaiuto - Sanzio's wife
 Omero Antonutti - Mario's father
 Marco Baliani - Davide Nadal
 Giulia Michelini - Francesca
 Nello Mascia - Alfredo

References

External links

2007 films
Italian thriller drama films
2007 thriller drama films
2007 drama films
2000s Italian films